James H. Maynard (born February 14, 1940) is an American entrepreneur and is the Chairman & CEO of the Investors Management Corporation, a holding company for food service and service industries, the largest of which is Golden Corral Corporation.

Born in Jacksonville, North Carolina, Maynard graduated from East Carolina University in 1965 with a Bachelor's Degree in Psychology. Along with William F. Carl, he conceived and opened the first Golden Corral restaurant in Fayetteville in 1973. He organized Investors Management Corporation and developed Golden Corral Family Steak House restaurant chain and other IMC subsidiaries. Maynard is now the owner or franchisor of approximately 500 restaurants nationwide with sales in excess of $1.3 billion.

On May 17, 2011, Maynard and his wife Connie donated $10.5 million to the children's hospital at Vidant Medical Center. $9 million went to the children's hospital itself, while the other $1.5 million funded a distinguished professorship in the Department of Pediatrics within the Brody School of Medicine at East Carolina University. The name of the hospital is called James and Connie Maynard Children's Hospital.

References

 "Maynard's Midas Touch" East magazine (East Carolina University), Winter 2006 edition
 "James Maynard" SMEI (Sales & Marketing Executives International, Inc.) Academy of Achievement
 Golden Corral Corporation Company Profile - Yahoo! Finance

1941 births
Living people
20th-century American businesspeople
American chief executives
East Carolina University alumni
People from Jacksonville, North Carolina
21st-century American businesspeople
Businesspeople from North Carolina